Border Battle or Battle of the Border or similar, may refer to:

Sports
 Kentucky–Tennessee rivalry in sports
 Wisconsin vs Minnesota in sports
 Milwaukee Brewers vs Minnesota Twins in Major League Baseball rivalries
 Minnesota–Wisconsin football rivalry
 Battle of the Border (Lamar–McNeese State) of Texas–Louisiana

Warfare
 Battle of the Border, a series of battles in the opening days of the Battle of Poland in 1939 during World War II

Other uses
 Battle for the Border, an award-winning news documentary written and produced by news reporter Jeremy Hubbard

See also
 Battle of the Persian Border (551 BC) between Media and Persia
 Border War (disambiguation)